Petanqui (original title: Pétanqui (Le droit à la vie) is a 1983 drama film directed by Yeo Kozoloa.

Synopsis
During the drought, Pétanqui - who is responsible for the distribution of food to the population - enjoys a good life, a nice house, lovers and an official car. His son returns from France with a law degree, and although he does not approve his father’s lifestyle, he decides to defend him in court when he is accused of embezzlement.

His defence becomes a strong attack on civil servants and members of government who take advantage of their situation. After all, his father is the lesser evil of a state of generalized corruption in the country.

From the novel 15 ans ça suffit by Amadou Ousmane.

Bibliografia
 Martin, Michael, Cinemas of the Black Diaspora, Wayne State University Press, 1995, p. 165. in 
 L'Association des trois mondes, Dictionnaire du cinéma africain, Tome I, Ministère de la coopération et du développement, 1991, p. 132 in 
 Stam, Robert; Raengo, Alessandra, Literature and Film, Blackwell Publishing, 2005, p. 307 in

See also
History of Cinema in Ivory Coast

External links

Petanqui in Africultures (in French)

References

Ivorian drama films
1983 films
1983 drama films